The 2015 Hong Kong Tennis Open (also known as the Prudential Hong Kong Tennis Open for sponsorship reasons) was a professional tennis tournament played on hard courts. It was the sixth edition of the tournament, and part of the 2015 WTA Tour. It took place in Victoria Park, Hong Kong, from October 12 to 18.

Points and prize money

Point distribution

Prize money

1 Qualifiers prize money is also the Round of 32 prize money
* per team

Singles main-draw entrants

Seeds

 1 Rankings are as of October 5, 2015

Other entrants
The following players received wildcards into the singles main draw:
  Jelena Janković
  Angelique Kerber
  Samantha Stosur
  Zhang Ling

The following players received entry from the qualifying draw:
  Ana Bogdan
  Jang Su-jeong
  Miyu Kato
  Kateryna Kozlova
  Lee Ya-hsuan
  Irina Ramialison

The following players received entry as lucky losers:
  Yuliya Beygelzimer
  Anastasiya Komardina

Withdrawals
Before the tournament
  Victoria Azarenka →replaced by  Wang Yafan
  Eugenie Bouchard  (concussion) →replaced by  Anastasia Rodionova
  Casey Dellacqua (concussion)→replaced by  Yuliya Beygelzimer
  Zarina Diyas →replaced by  Risa Ozaki
  Sabine Lisicki (knee injury) →replaced by  Francesca Schiavone
  Garbiñe Muguruza (left ankle injury)→replaced by  Anastasiya Komardina
  Ajla Tomljanović →replaced by  Zhang Kailin
  CoCo Vandeweghe →replaced by  Luksika Kumkhum

Retirements
  Christina McHale (left elbow injury)

Doubles main-draw entrants

Seeds

1 Rankings are as of October 5, 2015

Other entrants 
The following pairs received wildcards into the doubles main draw:
  Ki Yan-tung /  Maggie Ng
  Sher Chun-wing /  Wu Ho-ching

Withdrawals 
During the tournament
  Chang Kai-chen (neck injury)
  Christina McHale (left elbow injury)
  Lee Ya-hsuan (right hamstring strain)

Champions

Singles

 Jelena Janković def.  Angelique Kerber 3–6, 7–6(7–4), 6–1

Doubles

  Alizé Cornet /  Yaroslava Shvedova def.  Lara Arruabarrena /  Andreja Klepač 7–5, 6–4

References

External links
Official site

Hong Kong Open (tennis)
Hong Kong Open (tennis)
2015 in Hong Kong sport
2015 in Chinese tennis